Kotamarthy is a village in Addagudur Mandal, Yadadri District, Telangana State, India. The postal code is 508277.

References

Villages in Nalgonda district